H.U.R.L. is a non-violent first person shooter aimed at children. It was released in 1995 by Deep River Publishing for IBM PC compatibles. It was re-released as Slob Zone 3D, and then translated to German and released as Blob Schlammschlacht 3D ("Blob Mudfight 3D").

Gameplay 

The game takes place in an area called The Slob Zone, which is under the control of Bob the Slob, who controls the Hardcore Union of Radical Litterbugs, the legion of oversized creatures such as frogs and cats that gives the game its name. The game provides a storyline stating that Bob the Slob has stolen the world's supply of clean underwear and it is up to the player to get it back. The player navigates through various neighborhoods from which the human population seems to have been chased out, and which are now occupied by the aforementioned sloppy animals, most of whom are armed with trash and ready to dump it on any player attempting to break in and clean up. The hero's role involves not only staying clean while navigating through the game's ten increasingly messy levels, but also cleaning up after the animals, who have dirtied the landscape with waste items such as banana peels, empty soda bottles, and apple cores. As the players gathers up rubbish, they will find vending machines where it can be dropped off and traded for weapons: soap, water balloons, and deodorant, which they can use to fight back against the animals as they hurl their trash. If an animal is hit too many times, it will stop attacking and usually allow the player to pass. If the player is hit too many times, the screen displays the message "YOU'VE BEEN SLOBBED!" and the level starts over again with all the trash and animals respawned, and no weapons or trash in the hands of the player. However, the game can be saved at any point, and restoring a saved game will also restore the weapons and money the player had when it was saved.

Lacking violence, the game uses graphical surrealism and potty humor to keep its young audience interested. The player must search each level for bathrooms, which can contain a clean toilet where the player may be "healed" of grime such as kitty litter. In the final level the player sneaks into a nightclub and then into a house with no bathroom, and meets the game's only boss, whose weapon of choice is his own dirty diapers and who emits a brief fart-like sound when hit. As the game earned an RSAC rating suitable for children, no graphic depictions of anything obscene are included.

Reception

The artificial intelligence of the enemies has been criticized for being of sub-standard quality. Some animals disobey the apparent rules of surrender in that they will not let the player pass by even after being defeated (this is sometimes known as solid corpses in more violent games), and one game reviewer noted his frustration with being unable to complete a level simply because an animal was blocking his passage through a door.

References

First-person shooters
1995 video games
Video games with 2.5D graphics
DOS games
DOS-only games
Video games developed in the United States
Sprite-based first-person shooters
3D GameStudio games